Gene Farber (born November 14, 1978 in Minsk, Belarus) is an American actor of Belarusian-Jewish descent.

Filmography

Films
Virtuality (2010)
Das Boot (2010)
X-Men: First Class (2011) - Soviet Radioman
Idiot (2012)
The Body Tree (2015)
Captain America: Civil War (2016) - Vasily Karpov
One Under the Sun (2017)

TV series
Person of Interest (episode "Provenance")
Vegas (episode "Two of Kind")
CSI: NY (episode "Brooklyn Til I Die")
Law & Order: Los Angeles (episode "Plummer Park")
Undercovers
The Whole Truth (episode "Thicker Than Water")
In Plain Sight (episode "Coma Chameleon")
24 (4 episodes)CSI: Crime Scene Investigation (episode "Sin City Blue")Lie to Me (episode "Fold Equity")The Mentalist (episode "Bloodshot")Numb3rs (episode "Sneakerhead")Law & Order (2 episodes)Law & Order: Criminal Intent (episode "Shrink-Wrapped")Elementary (episode "Under My Skin")
Perception (episode "Meat")
NCIS: Los Angeles (episode "No More Secrets")

Video games
Command & Conquer: Red Alert 3 (2008)
Command & Conquer: Red Alert 3 - Uprising (2009)
Call of Duty: Black Ops - Grigori Weaver (2010, voice)
Ace Combat: Assault Horizon (2011, voice)
Tom Clancy's Ghost Recon: Future Soldier (2012, voice)
Medal of Honor: Warfighter (2012, voice)
Killzone: Shadow Fall - Sgt. Lucas Kellan (2013, voice)
The Amazing Spider-Man 2 (2014, voice)
Call of Duty: Modern Warfare - Sgt. Kamarov (2019, voice)
Call of Duty: Black Ops Cold War - Grigori Weaver (2020, voice)

References

External links

Official website

Living people
American people of Belarusian-Jewish descent
American male actors
1978 births